Boris Batinić (born 17 March 1981) is a former Croatian handball player.

For most of his career he played for his hometown club HRK Karlovac. He also played for RK Zamet Rijeka, RK Zagreb and RK Pipo IPC from Čakovec.

Honours
RK Zagreb
Croatian First League: 2004-05
Croatian Cup: 2005
EHF Cup Winners' Cup Final: 2005

References

Croatian male handball players
RK Zamet players
RK Zagreb players
Sportspeople from Karlovac
Handball players from Rijeka
1981 births
Living people